The 1946–47 William & Mary Indians men's basketball team represented the College of William & Mary in intercollegiate basketball during the 1946–47 NCAA men's basketball season. Under the only year of head coach Richard F. Gallagher (who concurrently served as the head baseball coach), the team finished the season 14–12 and 6–6 in the Southern Conference. This was the 42nd season of the collegiate basketball program at William & Mary, whose nickname is now the Tribe. William & Mary played its home games at Blow Gymnasium.

The Indians finished in 9th place in the conference and failed to qualify for the 1947 Southern Conference men's basketball tournament.

The Indians played three teams for the first time this season: American, Penn, and Boston University.

Schedule

|-
!colspan=9 style="background:#006400; color:#FFD700;"| Regular season

Source

References

William & Mary Tribe men's basketball seasons
William and Mary Indians
William and Mary Indians Men's Basketball Team
William and Mary Indians Men's Basketball Team